Harakat Ahrar al-Sham al-Islamiyya, commonly referred to as Ahrar al-Sham, is a coalition of multiple Islamist and Salafist units that coalesced into a single brigade and later a division in order to fight against the Syrian Government led by Bashar al-Assad during the Syrian Civil War. Ahrar al-Sham was led by Hassan Aboud until his death in 2014. In July 2013, Ahrar al-Sham had 10,000 to 20,000 fighters, which at the time made it the second most powerful unit fighting against al-Assad, after the Free Syrian Army. It was the principal organization operating under the umbrella of the Syrian Islamic Front and was a major component of the Islamic Front. With an estimated 20,000 fighters in 2015, Ahrar al-Sham became the largest rebel group in Syria after the Free Syrian Army became less powerful. Ahrar al-Sham and Jaysh al-Islam are the main rebel groups supported by Turkey.
On 18 February 2018, Ahrar al-Sham merged with the Nour al-Din al-Zenki Movement to form the Syrian Liberation Front.

The group aims to create an Islamic state under Sharia law.

While both are major rebel groups, Ahrar al-Sham is not to be confused with Tahrir al-Sham, its main rival and former ally. Before 2016, Ahrar al-Sham cooperated with the al-Nusra Front, originally an affiliate of al-Qaeda. However, from 2017 onward it increasingly fought against al-Nusra, which rebranded as Tahrir al-Sham with a former Ahrar leader, Abu Jaber, as emir, and recruited some of Ahrar al-Sham's most hardline units.

Ideology
Ahrar al-Sham has defined itself in this way:
The Islamic Movement of the Free Men of the Levant is an Islamist, reformist, innovative and comprehensive movement. It is integrated with the Islamic Front and is a comprehensive and Islamic military, political and social formation. It aims to completely overthrow the Assad regime in Syria and build an Islamic state whose only sovereign, reference, ruler, direction, and individual, societal and nationwide unifier is Allah Almighty's Sharia (law).

According to the International Crisis Group in 2012, Ahrar al-Sham, along with the al-Nusra Front, has "embraced the language of jihad and called for an Islamic state based on Salafi principles." The group has a Syrian leadership and "emphasizes that its campaign is for Syria, not for a global jihad". However, according to US intelligence officials, a few al-Qaeda members released from prisons by the Syrian government have been able to influence actions of the group, and install operatives within the senior ranks of Ahrar al-Sham. Such ties were not disclosed publicly until January 2014, when a former senior leader of Ahrar al-Sham, the now deceased Abu Khalid al-Suri, acknowledged his long-time membership in al-Qaeda and role as Ayman al-Zawahiri's representative in the Levant.

1.2 Nationalist motivations
Some scholars have argued for Ahrar al-Sham to be noted as a "nationalist jihadist salafi" group. The goal of regime change can be seen in Ahrar al-Sham's involvement in the conflict in Syria. Ahrar al-Sham has joined forces with other groups in the conflict in their opposition to the Assad regime in Syria.

Regional expert Aymenn Jawad Al-Tamimi has speculated two factions existed within Ahrar al-Sham, a nationalist moderate faction and a Salafi Jihadi faction influenced largely by the al-Qaeda linked Abu Khalid al-Suri whom was appointed by Ayman al-Zawahiri to act as a mediator between Jabhat al-Nusra and ISIL, the faction at the time mostly existing in eastern Syria, in particular in Hasakah and having a pro-Caliphate outlook, that allied with ISIL and held ties with Ansar al-Islam with a number of Ahrar al-Sham members later joining ISIL during the group's presence there. As a result, Ahrar al-Sham has been described as being diverse group in this regard, in December 2016 another Salafi faction called Jaysh al-Ahrar headed by Abu Jaber Shaykh, a senior commander in Ahrar al-Sham, split from the group and joined Hayat Tahrir al-Sham but later left HTS due to disagreements with the leadership and the resignation of the Saudi cleric Abdullah al-Muhaysini, Jaysh al-Ahrar eventually joined the National Front for Liberation alongside Ahrar al-Sham in 2018.

In its first audio address, Ahrar al-Sham stated its goal was to replace the Assad government with a Sunni Islamic state. It acknowledged the need to take into account the population's current state of mind. It also described the uprising as a jihad against a Safawi plot to spread Shia Islam and establish a Shia state from Iran through Iraq and Syria, extending to Lebanon and Palestine. Ahrar al-Sham has claimed that it only targets government forces and militia and that it has cancelled several operations due to fear of civilian casualties. It provides humanitarian services and relief to local communities, in addition to pamphlets promoting religious commitment in daily life.

Ahrar al-Sham leader Hassan Aboud stated that Ahrar al-Sham worked with the Nusra Front and would have no problems with al-Nusra as long as they continued fighting the regime. Aboud also said Ahrar worked with the Islamic State of Iraq and the Levant (ISIL) in some battles, but that their agenda was disagreeable. He said all parties, whether they were ISIL, al-Nusra, the Islamic Front, or the FSA, shared the same objective of establishing an Islamic state, but they differed as to the "tactics, strategies or methods". Aboud claimed that in Syria "there are no secular groups". Aboud condemned democracy in an interview with Al-Jazeera, saying that "Democracy is people governing people, according to rules they please. We say that we have a divine system whose law is Allah's for his creatures and his slaves who he appointed as viceregents on this Earth."

Mohamed Najeeb Bannan, an Islamic Front Sharia Court judge in Aleppo, stated, "The legal reference is the Islamic Sharia. The cases are different, from robberies to drug use, to moral crimes. It's our duty to look at any crime that comes to us. ... After the regime has fallen, we believe that the Muslim majority in Syria will ask for an Islamic state. Of course, it's very important to point out that some say the Islamic Sharia will cut off people's hands and heads, but it only applies to criminals. And to start off by killing, crucifying etc. That is not correct at all." In response to being asked what the difference between the Islamic Front's and the Islamic State's version of sharia would be, he said "One of their mistakes is before the regime has fallen, and before they've established what in Sharia is called Tamkeen [having a stable state], they started applying Sharia, thinking God gave them permission to control the land and establish a Caliphate. This goes against the beliefs of religious scholars around the world. This is what [ISIL] did wrong. This is going to cause a lot of trouble. Anyone who opposes [ISIL] will be considered against Sharia and will be severely punished."

In February 2015, after the Charlie Hebdo shooting carried out by individuals linked to al-Qaeda in the Arabian Peninsula, a pro-opposition newspaper printed papers with the Je Suis Charlie slogan as well as a tribute to those who were killed in the attack, which was viewed as anti-Islamic by Ahrar al-Sham and some members were filmed burning copies of the newspaper with "Je Suis Charlie" printed on it, the newspaper's writers responded by saying the publication was taken out of context.

Ahrar al-Sham, and the Islamic Front in general, issued condolences for Afghan Taliban leader Mullah Omar upon his death.

In August 2015, Ahrar al-Sham commander Eyad Shaar said "We are part of Syrian society and the international community. ... We want to be part of the solution."

Ahrar al-Sham's political representative stated in December 2015 that Ahrar al-Sham are "not related with al Qaeda, we only fight with them against Assad and ISIS".

In an Amnesty International report in July 2016, Ahrar al-Sham, along with al-Nusra Front, was described as having "applied a strict interpretation of Shari'a and imposed punishments amounting to torture or other ill-treatment for perceived infractions." A political activist was abducted and detained by Ahrar al-Sham for having not worn a veil and accused of affiliation with the Syrian government. At least three children have been recorded to be abducted by Jabhat al-Nusra and Ahrar al-Sham between 2012 and 2015. Lawyers and political activists have faced reprisal attacks by Ahrar al-Sham and other Islamist rebel groups due to their political activities and perceived religious beliefs.

In May 2016, Ahrar al-Sham released an address by then deputy general director Ali al-Omar in which he distinguished Ahrar al-Sham's militancy from the Salafi jihadism of al-Qaeda and ISIL, and defended its political engagement. During al-Omar's address, he stated that Ahrar al-Sham was a new school of Islamism born out of three other currents created after the fall of the Ottoman Empire, those currents being political organizations such as the Muslim Brotherhood, prostelyzation movements like the Tablighi Jamaat, and the general Jihadist movement, and that Ahrar al-Sham combines elements of these currents into its own methodology and practices establishing it as a new school of Islamism.

On 18 June 2017, Ahrar al-Sham adopted Unified Arab Law in its courts in Syria. On 21 June, the group issued a fatwa permitting it to display the Syrian independence flag.

Governance
During the group's existence, it has administered localities under its control including areas in the Raqqa Governorate, the Deir ez-Zor Governorate and elsewhere in Syria. Ahrar al-Sham also held strong ties to Syria's Arab tribes in the south and recruited several tribesmen from southern Syria into the group.

In 2013, during the opposition's offensive in Raqqa, Ahrar al-Sham established a local affiliate known as Brigade of the Trustees of Raqqa, the brigade acted as a law enforcement unit in Raqqa and cooperated with local Islamic courts in enforcing Sharia law, and reportedly beat an individual in the city per the ruling of a local court. The brigade also took part in humanitarian activities such as food distribution to locals.

An internal faction of Ahrar al-Sham, known as the Ashidaa Mujahideen Brigade, led by Abu al-Abd Ashidaa had flogged individuals for not attending Friday prayers.

History

Formation and early activities
Salafi groups emerged as important political and social actors in Egypt and Tunisia after the Arab Spring. Salafist groups can look very different from each other but author Markus Holdo identifies three accepted categories of Salafist groups. There are scripturalist Salafis who refuse to participate in politics because they find it useless in achieving their goals, the political Salafist who do engage in politics while seeking to put in place a fundamentalist agenda, and lastly there are the Jihadist Salafis who identify as part of a global jihad and generally find more popularity among younger people. While there may be differences in how Jihadist Salafist groups define the act of jihad, they generally reject the institutional politics of liberal democracy and westernization because "of its inability to deliver the material and ethical goods they demand." Jihadist Salafist do not just rally behind a shared religious view, but around fighting the ideals they think exist in institutional politics such as hierarchy, exclusion, and corruption. Ahrar al-Sham can be described as Jihadist Salafis whose definition of Jihad is one of active war fighting. Often, this view of Jihad is used as a recruitment tool by calling fighters to join a cause and complete their duty to Islam.

Ahrar al-Sham started forming units just after the Egyptian revolution of January 2011, and before the Syrian uprising started in March 2011. Most of the group's founders were Salafist political prisoners who had been detained for years at the Sednaya prison until they were released as part of an amnesty by the Syrian Government in March–May 2011. At the time of its establishment in December 2011, Ahrar al-Sham consisted of about 25 rebel units spread across Syria. On 23 January 2012, the Ahrar al-Sham Battalions was officially announced in the Idlib Governorate. In the same announcement, the group claimed responsibility for an attack on the security headquarters in the city of Idlib. "To all the free people of Syria, we announce the formation of the Free Ones of the Levant Battalions," the statement said, according to a translation obtained by the Long War Journal. "We promise God, and then we promise you, that we will be a firm shield and a striking hand to repel the attacks of this criminal Al Assad army with all the might we can muster. We promise to protect the lives of civilians and their possessions from security and the Shabiha [pro-government] militia. We are a people who will either gain victory or die."

By July 2012, the group's website listed 50 units, and by mid-January 2013, the number had increased to 83 units. Most of these units are headquartered in villages in Idlib Governorate, but many others are located in Hama and Aleppo Governorates. Some Ahrar al-Sham units that have been involved in heavy fighting include the Qawafel al-Shuhada and Ansar al-Haqq Brigades (both in Khan Shaykhun), the al-Tawhid wal-Iman Brigade (Maarat al-Nu'man, Idlib), the Shahba Brigade (Aleppo City), the Hassane bin Thabet Brigade (Darat Izza, Aleppo), and the Salahaddin and Abul-Fida Brigades (both in Hama City).

Members of the group are Sunni Islamists. Ahrar al-Sham cooperates with the Free Syrian Army; however, it does not maintain ties with the Syrian National Council. Although they coordinate with other groups, they maintain their own strict and secretive leadership, receiving the majority of their funding and support from donors in Kuwait.

Ahrar al-Sham was credited for rescuing NBC News team including reporter Richard Engel, producer Ghazi Balkiz, cameraman John Kooistra and others after they were kidnapped in December 2012. While Engel initially blamed pro-Assad Shabiha militants for the abduction, it later turned out that they were "almost certainly" abducted by an FSA affiliated rebel group. There were around 500 people in Ahrar al-Sham in August 2012.

2013–2014: The Islamic Front

In December 2012, a new umbrella organization was announced, called the Syrian Islamic Front, consisting of 11 Islamist rebel organizations. Ahrar al-Sham was the most prominent of these, and a member of Ahrar al-Sham's, Abu 'Abd Al-Rahman Al-Suri (aka Abdulrahman Al Soory), served as the Front's spokesman.

In January 2013, several of the member organizations of the Syrian Islamic Front announced that they were joining forces with Ahrar al-Sham into a broader group called Harakat Ahrar al-Sham al-Islamiyya (The Islamic Movement of Ahrar al-Sham).

In May 2013, Ahrar al-Sham alongside Al-Nusra, ISIL and the Tawhid Brigade fought the Ghuraba al-Sham Front because of looting and corruption on behalf of Ghuraba al-Sham as well as disputes Ghuraba al-Sham had with the Aleppo Sharia Court.

In September 2013, members of ISIL killed the Ahrar al-Sham commander Abu Obeida Al-Binnishi, after he had intervened to protect a Malaysian Islamic charity; ISIL had mistaken its Malaysian flag for that of the United States.

In August 2013, members of the brigade uploaded a video of their downing of a Syrian Air Force MiG-21 over the Latakia province with a Chinese-made FN-6 MANPADS, apparently becoming the first recorded kill with such a weapon.

In mid-November 2013, after the Battle for Brigade 80 near the Aleppo International Airport, fighters from the Islamic State of Iraq and the Levant beheaded a commander of Ahrar al-Sham forces, mistaking him for an Iraqi Shiite pro-government militiaman.

In November 2013, the SIF announced that it was dissolving, and that its components would henceforth operate as part of the newly formed Islamic Front.

In December 2013, there were reports of fighting between ISIL & another Islamic rebel group in the town of Maskana, Aleppo; activists reported that the Islamic rebel group was identified as Ahrar al-Sham.

2014–2016: shifting alliances with rebels and Islamists
On 23 February 2014, one of the top commanders and al-Qaeda representative, Abu Khalid al-Suri, was killed in a suicide bombing in Aleppo, organized by ISIL. In March 2015, the Suqour al-Sham Brigade merged with Ahrar al-Sham, but left in September 2016. Later in September, Suqour al-Sham joined the Army of Conquest, a group which also has Ahrar al-Sham as a member.

September 2014: leadership killed in bomb attack
On 9 September 2014, a bomb went off during a high-level meeting in Idlib province, killing Hassan Abboud, the leader of the group, and 27 other senior commanders, including military field commanders, members of the group's Shura council, and leaders of allied brigades. There was no claim of responsibility for the attack. The day after the bombing Abu Jaber was announced as replacement leader. Ahrar ash-Sham received condolences from the al-Qaeda organization Nusra. Ahrar received condolences from other al-Qaeda members.

In early November 2014, representatives from Ahrar al-Sham reportedly attended a meeting with al-Nusra Front, the Khorasan Group, the Islamic State of Iraq and the Levant, and Jund al-Aqsa, which sought to unite the groups against the Syrian government. However, by 14 November 2014, it was reported that the negotiations had failed.

During the night of 6 November 2014, a US airstrike targeted the group for the first time, hitting its headquarters in Idlib governorate and killing Abu al-Nasr, who was in charge of receiving weapons for the group. On 24 November 2014, a US airstrike on the ISIL headquarters building in Ma'dan, Raqqa, killed another Ahrar al-Sham fighter, who was being held prisoner by ISIL.

The New York Times reported that the pro Al-Qaeda Saudi cleric Abdullah Al-Muhaisini ordered that Christians in Idlib were not to be killed, and that Christians were being defended by Ahrar al-Sham. However, according to Middle East Christian News, there were subsequent unconfirmed reports from the Assyrian Observatory for Human Rights of Ahrar al-Sham executing two Christians in the city.

On 26 April 2015, Ahrar al-Sham, along with other major Aleppo based groups, established the Fatah Halab joint operations room.

On 14 July 2015, two suicide bombers blew themselves up at an Ahrar al-Sham Movement headquarters killing Abu Abdul Rahman Salqeen (an Ahrar al-Sham leader) and 5-6 others in Idlib province.

Mohannad al-Masri, known by the alias Abu Yahia al-Hamawi, was appointed leader in September 2015. Ali al-Omar, known by the alias Abu Ammar al-Omar, was appointed leader in November 2016.

In October 2015, Abu Amara Brigades left the Levant Front, which they had joined in February 2015, and joined Ahrar al-Sham.

On 21 October 2015, the Jund al Malahim operations room was created as an alliance of Ajnad al Sham, Ahrar al-Sham and Al-Nusra in Rif Dimashq.

On 25 February 2016, a car bomb was detonated at the Russian military base in Idlib, Syria. Ahrar al-Sham claimed responsibility on their website alleging "dozens" of casualties among Russian officials. On the following day, Jaysh al-Sunna's branch in Hama merged with Ahrar al-Sham, though its northern Aleppo branch was not a part of this merger.

On 13 May 2016, Amnesty International named Ahrar al-Sham as one of the groups responsible for "repeated indiscriminate attacks that may amount to war crimes" and reported allegations of their use of chemical weapons. On 12 May 2016, Al-Nusra Front fighters attacked and captured the Alawite village of Zara'a, Southern Hama Governorate. Pro-government media reported that Ahrar al-Sham fighters were involved. The Syrian Observatory for Human Rights confirmed that civilians had been kidnapped and the Red Crescent reportedly confirmed that 42 civilians and seven National Defence Force (pro-government militia) fighters were killed during the militant attack. Additionally, some pro-Syrian government news sources reported that around 70 civilians, including women and children were kidnapped and taken to Al-Rastan Plains. Some of the captured were pro-government soldiers.

In September 2016, Ashida'a Mujahideen Brigade left Ahrar al-Sham, apparently due to Ahrar's support of Turkey's Operation Euphrates Shield and lack of willingness to be closer to al-Nusra Front.

Ahrar al-Sham was praised by Tawfiq Shahabuddin, leader of the Nour al-Din al-Zenki Movement, in October 2016.

On 10 December 2016, 16 Ahrar al-Sham units under Hashim Sheikh, known by the alias Abu Jaber, formed a quasi-independent group within Ahrar called Jaysh al-Ahrar, or the Free Army, for similar reasons as Ashida'a Mujahideen Brigade leaving 3 months prior.

Syrian Civil War battles and offensives

In September 2015: In collaboration with Jabhat al-Nusra, Ahrar al-Sham overtook an Assad regime stronghold, the Abu al-Zuhur military air base in Idlib governorate.

Autumn 2015: In alliance with Jabhat al-Nusra, Ahrar al-Sham was involved in offensives in Northern Aleppo against ISIS and in Southern Aleppo against Assad regime forces.

May and June 2016: Allied with Jabhat al-Nusra, they conducted attacks in Northern Aleppo against ISIS that initially made rapid advances but were eventually pushed back.

Spring 2016: Ahrar al-Sham was involved in heavy fighting with other Anti-ISIS rebel forces in Eastern and Western Ghouta and in the Dar'a region in southern Syria.

June 2016: In alliance with Jabhat al-Nusra and others, major offensive against Assad regime forces in Jabal al-Akrad.

2017 onwards: conflict with al-Nusra/HTS
On 21 January 2017, five factions from Ahrar reportedly left to join al-Nusra Front: Jaysh al-Ahrar, al-Bara, Dhu Nurayn, al-Sawa'iq and Usud al-Har Battalion.

On 23 January 2017, the al-Nusra Front attacked Jabhat Ahl al-Sham bases in Atarib and other towns in western Aleppo. All the bases were captured and by 24 January, the group was defeated and joined Ahrar al-Sham.

On 25 January 2017, several factions from Jaysh al-Islam based in Aleppo left to join Ahrar, establishing the Ansar Regiment. On the same day, the remaining Fastaqim Union members of its Aleppo branch joined Ahrar al-Sham.

On 25 January 2017, Suqour al-Sham Brigade along with the Idlib branch of Jaysh al-Islam and the Aleppo branch of the Levant Front joined Ahrar al-Sham. On the following day, al-Miiqdad Brigade also joined Ahrar.

On 4 February 2017, American aircraft killed an Egyptian al-Qaeda member, Abu Hani al-Masri. He was killed in Idlib's Sarmada region by a drone strike. Egyptian Islamic Jihad was co-created by him. Thomas Joscelyn pointed out that the publication al-Masra of al-Qaeda in the Arabian Peninsula talked about Abu Hani al-Masri. He was also a military commander in Ahrar ash-Sham. In Egypt he was jailed for several years and he was in Chechnya, Bosnia, Afghanistan, and Somalia. In 2012 he was released from prison in Egypt. In Chechnya, several Russian prisoners once appeared in a video with Abu Hani al-Masri.

Jaber Ali Basha and Anas Abu Malek were made deputy leaders of Ahrar al-Sham in February 2017.

On 31 July 2017, Hassan Soufan, also known by his nom de guerre "Abu al-Bara", was appointed as the leader of Ahrar al-Sham's shura council. Soufan was born in Latakia, and in 2004, Saudi Arabia extradited him to the Syrian government, which sentenced him to life imprisonment in Sednaya Prison. In December 2016, he was released as part of an agreement during which the rebels withdrew from Aleppo. Soufan was among those who temporarily split from Ahrar al-Sham as part of Jaysh al-Ahrar in the same month.

On 6 August 2017, 120 Ahrar al-Sham fighters in Arbin, Eastern Ghouta defected to the al-Rahman Legion after internal disputes. Ahrar al-Sham accused the Rahman Legion of seizing their weapons, while the Rahman Legion accused Ahrar al-Sham of their attempt to implement their "failed" experience from northern Syria in eastern Ghouta. A ceasefire agreement between the Rahman Legion and Ahrar al-Sham was implemented on 9 August.

Around 2,000 fighters in Ahrar al-Sham came from Hama. After its defeat in Idlib by Tahrir al-Sham in July 2017, territorial control by Ahrar al-Sham are confined to the al-Ghab Plain, Mount Zawiya, Ariha, and a number of villages in the northeastern Latakia Governorate and the western Aleppo Governorate.

In August 2018, Hassan Soufan resigned as leader and deputy leader Jaber Ali Basha was promoted to replace him.

On 22 June 2018, an Ahrar al-Sham commander was assassinated in al-Bab by gunmen believed to be part of the Hamza Division.

Capabilities and tactics

Ahrar al-Sham is one of the best-armed and most powerful rebel factions active in the Syrian Civil War. It progressed from the use of improvised explosive devices and small-arms ambushes in early 2012 to assuming a lead role in large-scale sustained assaults on multiple fronts by 2013. The capture of materiel from the Syrian Armed Forces enabled Ahrar to regularly deploy tanks and mobile artillery and anti-tank guided missiles. It occasionally employed 1990s-era Croatian rocket and grenade launchers. Ahrar al Sham was involved in every major rebel victory over Syrian Government forces between September 2012 and mid-2013. Ahrar grew significantly by absorbing into its ranks other rebel factions from the Islamic Front and the Syrian Islamic Front which preceded it.

, Ahrar al-Sham had between 10,000 and 20,000 members. When Ahrar al-Sham cooperated with Jabhat al-Nusra, it had a force strong enough for military offensives that gained control of territory and pushed back Assad forces and the Islamic State. Aside from large scale offensives, Ahrar al-Sham was known for its use of Improvised Explosive Devices (IEDs) and a tactic in which they would target military bases and capture weapons. Ahrar al-Sham even has a technical division devoted to cyber attacks. There is one confirmed report of Ahrar al-Sham using a SVBIED and it associates with groups who do.

Foreign support
Discussions about foreign support in the media often center on the weapons that foreign powers provide to their proxies. Money is just as important as weapons though. As soon as a soldier / rebel has to fight away from his home, the rebel group has to pay at least his sustenance, and in practice some more. For Ahrar the amount of financial aid it got from abroad might be the very reason it became so powerful. After the December 2013 suspension of all U.S. and the U.K. non-lethal support, which included medicine, vehicles, and communications equipment, to the Free Syrian Army after the Islamic Front, a coalition of Islamist fighters that broke with the American-backed Free Syrian Army, had seized warehouses of equipment. In 2014 the U.S. was considering indirectly resuming non-lethal aid to the moderate opposition by having it "funneled exclusively through the Supreme Military Council, the military wing of moderate, secular Syrian opposition" even if some of it ends up going to Islamist groups. Several European states have attempted small-level engagements with individual Ahrar al-Sham political officials in Turkey.

Ahrar al-Sham generally welcomes foreign fighters without demanding too much of them. Ahrar al-Sham encourages foreign fighters to arrive unmarried, committed to stay with the organization for six months, and prepared to pay in advance for their stay and their own weapon. While Ahrar al-Sham does not consider jihad to be a duty for all Muslims, they do consider they objective of toppling the Assad regime in Syria to be a conflict that at its core is about Muslim concerns. While foreign fighters may come from other countries, Ahrar al-Sham extends welcoming arms because they believe in a common linkage among Muslims fighting for an Islamic regime in Syria.

Donations from supporters abroad were important for Ahrar's growth. Saudi Arabia, Qatar and Turkey have been reported to have actively supported Ahrar al-Sham. A statement issued by Ahrar al-Sham thanked Turkey and Qatar for their help. By 2013, the Kuwaiti private fund Popular Commission to Support the Syrian People, managed by Sheikh Ajmi and Sheik Irshid al-Hajri had supported Ahrar with US$400,000, for which Ahrar recorded a public thank you.

Designation as a terrorist organization and relations with other groups
Ahrar al-Sham is not designated a terrorist organization by the U.S. State Department, the United Nations, or the European Union. Since December 2015, the UN Security Council has been trying to assemble a list of terrorist groups in Syria. Syria, Iraq, Russia, Lebanon, Egypt, and the United Arab Emirates support classifying Ahrar al-Sham as a terrorist group, but they have not been able to achieve a unanimous consensus.

Ahrar al-Sham's relationships with U.N. designated terrorist organizations has been, and continues to be, a key point of contention in U.S. and Russian foreign relations and in their Syrian ceasefire negotiations. The U.S. Department of State has said that "Ahrar al-Sham is not a designated foreign terrorist organization". However, some U.S. officials have reportedly considered designating it as a terrorist organization because of its links to al-Qaeda subgroups such as the al-Nusra Front.

In a speech at 28 June 2016 Aspen Ideas Festival in Colorado, United States Secretary of State John Kerry referred to Ahrar al-Sham as one of several "subgroups" of terrorist groups, saying

before which he had said of Ahrar al-Sham that

It was reported that administration officials disapproved this mention and thought that it would potentially harm the U.S. government efforts to convince the Russians and the Syrian government not to attack Ahrar al-Sham with one senior administration official reportedly saying that despite the fact that "for months, we’ve been arguing to make sure the Russians and the Syrian regime don’t equate these groups with the terrorists, Kerry's line yields that point." Explaining these comments, US State Department spokesman John Kirby said that "secretary Kerry was simply trying to describe the complexity of the situation in Syria, noting that we aren't blind to the notion that some fighters shift their loyalties." It was also reported that some Syrian groups see Kerry's comments as an example of how the Obama administration has slowly moved toward the Russian view of Syria, which includes painting all opposition groups as terrorists in order to justify attacking them.

Although Ahrar al-Sham is not officially designated as a terrorist organization in Germany, on 6 October 2016 a German court has convicted four German-Lebanese men who supplied the group in Syria of "supporting a terrorist organization", and, on 30 March 2017, two Syrian refugees who were members of Ahrar al-Sham were placed on trial in Munich, Germany for being members of a terrorist organization. According to the prosecutor, the goal of the group is to "overthrow the Syrian president Bashar al-Assad and establish an Islamic regime".

On the 29th of March 2019, the criminal court in Rotterdam, the Netherlands designated Ahrar al-Sham as a terrorist organization. The judge based his decision on the period between 2013 and 2018.

Relations with other groups

Ahrar al-Sham had worked with ISIL until the two groups began their present-day hostilities with one another in January 2014. During Ahrar al-Sham's presence in Deir ez-Zor, after capturing oil fields from the Syrian government alongside other opposition groups, the group alongside the al-Nusra Front and Jaysh al-Islam co-signed a request asking ISIL's leader Abu Bakr al-Baghdadi to mediate a dispute over an oil field that was recently captured. In one instance, a commander affiliated with the Syrian Revolutionaries Front, claimed that the Islamic Front, which Ahrar al-Sham was a principle and founding member of, was more extreme than al-Nusra, and would eventually become a second ISIL.

In 2013, in response to a chemical weapon attack in eastern Ghouta by Government forces, ISIL and the al-Nusra Front conducted separate revenge attacks, Ahrar al-Sham along with other Free Syrian Army-aligned factions including the Jesus Son of Mary Battalions and Alwiya al-Furqan jointly took part in the ISIL-led attacks code named "Volcano of Rage", and shelled Alawite neighborhoods in Damascus, as well areas near the Embassy of Russia in Damascus and the Four Seasons Hotel Damascus, where UN observers were reportedly staying to investigate the chemical attack. In the Raqqa Governorate between August and July 2013, several protests were held against both ISIL and Ahrar al-Sham, due to ISIL arresting Free Syrian Army commanders, the arrests also led to the defection of al-Nusra's commander from ISIL back to al-Nusra. The Ahfad al-Rasul Brigades supported the protests against ISIL and Ahrar al-Sham in August 2013.

Abu Khalid al-Suri, a "top al-Qaeda leader", co-founded Ahrar al-Sham and was until the time of his February 2014 death, by a suicide car bomb attack believed to be carried out by ISIL, though the attack was denied by ISIL, helping to lead Ahrar al-Sham which allowed Ayman Zawahiri, the leader of al-Qaeda, to influence the rebel group's actions despite the group officially having no affiliation with al-Qaeda. In 2015, Ahrar al-Sham, "whose late leader fought alongside Osama bin Laden," again denied having any links to al-Qaeda and in May 2016, the U.S., Britain, France, and Ukraine blocked a Russian proposal to the United Nations to blacklist Ahrar al-Sham as a terrorist group. The group was openly allied with its longterm partner al-Nusra Front and carried out joint operations with the group, and was in talks with it about a possible merger in mid-2016. Pro-government media reported that Ahrar al-Sham rejected the 2016 September 12 U.S.- and Russian-brokered Syrian ceasefire, citing the ceasefire's exclusion of certain Syrian rebel groups and declared solidarity with the al-Nusra Front, which was one of the groups excluded from this ceasefire.

After fighting broke out between ISIL and other opposition factions in Syria, Ahrar al-Sham and ISIL mutually agreed to withdraw from each other's spheres of influence, with Ahrar al-Sham withdrawing from the Raqqa Governorate that was dominated by ISIL and ISIL agreed to withdraw from opposition strongholds in the Idlib Governorate in 2014.

However, since late 2016, Al-Nusra and Ahrar al-Sham have been increasingly rivalrous, with military clashes between them taking place in the Idlib Governorate in January–March 2017 and July 2017.

In July 2017, in ISIL's weekly online newspaper al-Naba, ISIL mentioned Ahrar al-Sham as having previously shown, what it considers good Islamic character, and mentioned that in past disputes between Ahrar al-Sham and ISIL, Ahrar al-Sham had resolved disputes in a way in accordance to Sharia law.

In February 2018 Ahrar al-Sham and the Nour al-Din al-Zenki Movement merged and formed the Syrian Liberation Front then launched an offensive against Tahrir al-Sham seizing several villages and the city of Maarrat al-Nu'man.

In January 2020, a former ISIL-linked media outlet that has since turned critical of ISIL, wrote in a publication that ISIL had allowed former Ahrar al-Sham members to "repent" in eastern Syria, and specifically mentioned one former Ahrar al-Sham commander that joined ISIL despite openly opposing the group, and though defecting to ISIL he did not hold a military position in the group but he did work in oil fields held by ISIL, and held a prominent position in ISIL's oil industry.

Flags

Member groups

 Al-Iman Army
 People of the Levant Front
 Army of Mujahideen
 19th Division
 Ansar Al Sharia Brigade
 Abdullah Ibn El-Zubeir Brigade
 The Men of Allah Brigade
 The Martyr Mustafa Abdul-Razzaq's Brigade
 Swords of The Most Compassionate Brigade
 Khan al-Asal Free Brigades
 Ash-Shuyukh Brigade
 Muhajireen Brigade
 Farouq Battalion
 5th Battalion
 Revolutionaries of Atarib Gathering
 Atarib Martyrs Brigade
 Battalion of the Martyr Alaa al-Ahmad
 Central Force for the City of Atarib
 Ansar al-Haqq Battalion
 Loyalty to God Battalion
 Shells of Justice Brigade
 Atarib Martyrs Brigade
 Jaysh al-Islam (Idlib branch)
 Fastaqim Union (most members, since January 2017)
 Kurdish Islamic Front
 Liwa al-Haqq
 Katibat al-Furati
 Kataeb Atbaa al-Rasoul
 Katibat al-Ansar
 Jaysh al-Sunna (Hama branch)
 Levant Front (South-western Aleppo branch)
 Farouq Brigades (Binnish remnants)
 Omar al-Farouq Brigade
 Jaysh al-Sham
 Brigade of Conquest (Idlib branch)
 Ibn Taymiyyah battalions
 al-Miqdad ibn Amr
 Supporters of the East Regiment
 Martyr Usama Suno Battalion
 Katibat Khaled Ibn al-Walid
 Tahrir al-Sham elements in Northern Aleppo City outskirts
 Fajr al-Umma Brigade
 Katibat Saraya al-Fath
 Katibat Ansar al-Huda
 Lions of Islam Battalion
 Manbij Brigade (part of the TFSA, and not the SLF)
 Homs Legion (part of the TFSA, and not the SLF)
 Liwa al-Haramayn al-Sharifiyeen
 The Kurdish Pavilion
 Abu Amara Battalions
 Binaa Ummah Movement
 Dabous al-Ghab
 Lancer Corps
 Martyr Colonel Ahmed al-Omar Brigade
 Tawhid al-Asimah Brigades and Battalions
 Wa'atasimu Brigade
 Al-Adiyat Brigade
 Al-Abbas Brigade
 Al-Muhajireen wal Ansar Brigade
 Ahrar al-Homs Brigade
 Soldiers of Sunnah Brigade
 Ahrar al-Jabal Brigade
 Thuwar al-Sham
 Khattab Brigade
 Badr Brigade
 Jund al-Sham Battalions
 Al-Bishr Brigades
 Commandos of the Levant Brigade
 Sheikh al-Islam Ibn Taymiyyah Battalion
 Martyr Abu Dawood Battalion
 Martyr Abu al-Baraa Battalion
 Al-Ikhlas Battalion
 Al-Jabriya Martyrs Battalion
 Sinjar Martyrs Battalion
 Martyr Adnan al-Timr Battalion
 Zeitan Battalions
 Liwa Rayat al-Nasr
 Battalions of Hamza ibn Abdul-Muttalib
 Al-Sakhana Brigades

Former groups
Groups in italics left to join Hayat Tahrir al-Sham (HTS)
 Ahrar al-Sharqiya
 Jaysh al-Ahrar (Left HTS in mid-2017 due to disagreements with the leadership becoming an independent faction, later joined the National Front for Liberation with Ahrar al-Sham in August 2018)
 Tamkeen Brigade
 Liwa Ahrar al-Jabal al-Wastani
 Conquest Brigade
 Suqour al-Sham Brigades
 Ansar al-Sham (Though joining HTS the group did come under attack from HTS in August 2018, resulting in its separation from the group.)
 Ajnad al-Sham (Temporarily joined HTS then rejoined Ahrar al-Sham in mid-2017, however the group eventually rejoined HTS thereafter.)
 Hudhayfah ibn al-Yaman Battalions
 Qassem Battalion
 Lions of Tawhid Battalion
 Katibat al-Siddiq
 Martyr Ibrahim Qabbani Battalion
 Tawhid Battalion
 Martyrs of Islam Front
 Knights of the Caliphate Battalion
 Mountain Lions Battalion
 Abdullah Azzam Brigade
 Iman Brigade
 Lions of War Brigade
 Ahl al-Bayt Brigade
 Al-Majd Brigade
 Liwa Umana al-Raqqa (Joined the Syrian Democratic Forces)
 Liwa Jund al-Haramain (Joined the Army of Mujahideen later joined the Syrian Democratic Forces.)
 Ashida'a Mujahideen Brigade

See also

 List of armed groups in the Syrian Civil War
 Abdul Razzaq al-Mahdi

References

External links

Terrorist incidents attributed to Ahrar al-Sham in the Global Terrorism Database- https://www.start.umd.edu/gtd/search/Results.aspx?chart=attack&casualties_type=&casualties_max=&perpetrator=40140
 

Anti-government factions of the Syrian civil war
Salafi Islamism
Salafi Islamist groups
2011 establishments in Syria
Military units and formations established in 2011
Organisations designated as terrorist by Iran
Organizations designated as terrorist by Egypt
Organizations designated as terrorist by Russia
Organizations designated as terrorist by Syria
Organizations designated as terrorist by the United Arab Emirates
Jihadist groups in Syria
Organizations based in Asia designated as terrorist
Turkish supported militant groups of the Syrian civil war